The Bruck–Ryser–Chowla theorem is a result on the combinatorics of block designs that implies nonexistence of certain kinds of design. It states that if a (v, b, r, k, λ)-design exists with v = b (a symmetric block design), then: 
 if v is even, then k − λ is a square;
 if v is odd, then the following Diophantine equation has a nontrivial solution:
 x2  − (k − λ)y2 − (−1)(v−1)/2 λ z2 = 0.

Projective planes 
In the special case of a symmetric design with λ = 1, that is, a projective plane, the theorem (which in this case is referred to as the Bruck–Ryser theorem) can be stated as follows: If a finite projective plane of order q exists and q is congruent to 1 or 2 (mod 4), then q must be the sum of two squares.  Note that for a projective plane, the design parameters are v = b = q2 + q + 1, r = k = q + 1, λ = 1. Thus, v is always odd in this case.

The theorem, for example, rules out the existence of projective planes of orders 6 and 14 but allows the existence of planes of orders 10 and 12.  Since a projective plane of order 10 has been shown not to exist using a combination of coding theory and large-scale computer search, the condition of the theorem is evidently not sufficient for the existence of a design.  However, no stronger general non-existence criterion is known.

Connection with incidence matrices 
The existence of a symmetric (v, b, r, k, λ)-design is equivalent to the existence of a v × v incidence matrix R with elements 0 and 1 satisfying

 

where  is the v × v identity matrix and J is the v × v all-1 matrix.  In essence, the Bruck–Ryser–Chowla theorem is a statement of the necessary conditions for the existence of a rational v × v matrix R satisfying this equation.  In fact, the conditions stated in the Bruck–Ryser–Chowla theorem are not merely necessary, but also sufficient for the existence of such a rational matrix R.  They can be derived from the Hasse–Minkowski theorem on the rational equivalence of quadratic forms.

References

 
 
 
 van Lint, J.H., and R.M. Wilson (1992), A Course in Combinatorics.  Cambridge, Eng.: Cambridge University Press.

External links 
 

Theorems in combinatorics
Theorems in projective geometry
Theorems in statistics
Design of experiments